Truganini (also known as Lallah Rookh; c. 1812 – 8 May 1876) was an Aboriginal Tasmanian woman. She was one of the last native speakers of the Tasmanian languages and one of the last individuals solely of Aboriginal Tasmanian descent.

Truganini grew up in the region around the D'Entrecasteaux Channel and Bruny Island. Many of her relatives were killed during the Black War. From 1829 she was associated with George Augustus Robinson, later an official of the colonial government of Van Diemen's Land. She accompanied him as a guide and served as an informant on Aboriginal language and culture. In 1835, Truganini and most other surviving Aboriginal Tasmanians were relocated to Flinders Island in the Bass Strait, where Robinson had established a mission. The mission proved unsuccessful, and disastrous for the Aboriginal Tasmanian people.

In 1839, Truganini, among sixteen Aboriginal Tasmanians, accompanied Robinson to the Port Phillip District in present-day Victoria. She soon severed ties with him. Around two years later, she and four other Aboriginal Tasmanians, including Tunnerminnerwait became outlaws, leading to the killing of two whalers and an eight-week pursuit and resistance campaign. The five of them were charged with murder. Tunnerminnerwait and another man were found guilty and executed, while Truganini and the others were returned to Tasmania. In 1847, she was moved to the Oyster Cove settlement close to her birthplace, where she maintained some traditional lifestyle elements.

By the 1860s, Truganini and William Lanne had become anthropological curiosities, being incorrectly regarded as the last "full-blood" Aboriginal Tasmanians under the racial categories used at the time. After her death in Hobart in 1876, her body was exhumed by the Royal Society of Tasmania. Her skeleton was on public display in the Tasmanian Museum until the 1940s, but was returned to the Aboriginal community in 1976 and cremated. Some of her remains were sent to the Royal College of Surgeons of England and were only repatriated in 2002.

Name and spelling
There are a number of other spellings of her name, including Trukanini, Trugernanner, Trugernena, Truganina, Trugannini, Trucanini, Trucaminni, and Trucaninny. Truganini was also widely known by the nickname Lalla(h) Rookh.

Early life

Truganini was born about 1812 on Bruny Island (Lunawanna-alonnah), located south of the Van Diemen's Land capital Hobart, and separated from the Tasmanian mainland by the D'Entrecasteaux Channel. She was a daughter of Mangana, chief of the Bruny Island people. In the indigenous Bruny Island language (Nuennonne), truganina was the name of the grey saltbush, Atriplex cinerea.

In her youth, her people still practised their traditional culture, but it was soon disrupted by European settlement. When Lieutenant-Governor George Arthur arrived in Van Diemen's Land in 1824, he implemented two policies to deal with the growing conflict between settlers and Aboriginal peoples. Bounties were awarded for the capture of Aboriginal adults and children, and an effort was made to establish friendly relations with Aboriginal people in order to lure them into camps. The campaign began on Bruny Island where hostilities had not been as marked as in other parts of Tasmania.

When Truganini met George Augustus Robinson, the Chief Protector of Aborigines, in 1829, her mother had been killed by sailors, her uncle shot by a soldier, her sister abducted by sealers, and her fiancé brutally murdered by timber-cutters, who then repeatedly sexually abused her.

Relocations

Flinders Island

In 1830, Robinson moved Truganini and her husband, Woorrady, to Flinders Island with most of the last surviving Tasmanian Aboriginal people, numbering approximately 100. The stated aim of isolation was to save them, but many of the group died from influenza and other diseases. In 1838, Truganini, among sixteen Aboriginal Tasmanians, helped Robinson to establish a settlement for mainland Aboriginal people at Port Phillip.

Victoria
Oral histories of Truganini report that after arriving in the new settlement of Melbourne and disengaging with Robinson, she had a child named Louisa Esmai with John Shugnow or Strugnell at Point Nepean in Victoria. Further, Truganini was from the bloodlines of Victoria's Kulin Nation tribes. Indeed, they hid the child from authorities hunting Truganini. After Truganini was captured and exiled, her daughter, Louisa, was raised in the Kulin Nation. Louisa married John Briggs and supervised the orphanage at Coranderrk Aboriginal Reserve when it was managed by Wurundjeri leaders including Simon Wonga and William Barak. Louisa was grandmother to Ellen Atkinson.

After about two years of living in and around Melbourne, she joined Tunnerminnerwait and three other Tasmanian Aboriginal people. The group became outlaws, robbing and shooting at settlers around Dandenong and triggering a long pursuit by the authorities. The outlaws moved on to Bass River and then Cape Paterson. There, members of the group murdered two whalers at Watson's hut. The group was captured and sent for trial for murder at Port Phillip. A gunshot wound to Truganini's head was treated by Dr Hugh Anderson of Bass River. The two men of the group were found guilty and hanged on 20 January 1842.

Oyster Cove

Truganini and most of the other Tasmanian Aboriginal people were returned to Flinders Island several months later. In 1856, the few surviving Tasmanian Aboriginal people at the Flinders Island settlement, including Truganini (not all Tasmanian Aboriginal people on the island as some suggest) were moved to a settlement at Oyster Cove, south of Hobart.

According to The Times newspaper, quoting a report issued by the Colonial Office, by 1861 the number of survivors at Oyster Cove was only fourteen: ...14 persons, all adults, aboriginals of Tasmania, who are the sole surviving remnant of ten tribes.  Nine of these persons are women and five are men.  There are among them four married couples, and four of the men and five of the women are under 45 years of age, but no children have been born to them for years. It is considered difficult to account for this... Besides these 14 persons there is a native woman who is married to a white man, and who has a son, a fine healthy-looking child...The article, headed "Decay of Race", adds that although the survivors enjoyed generally good health and still made hunting trips to the bush during the season, after first asking "leave to go", they were now "fed, housed and clothed at public expense" and "much addicted to drinking".

According to a report in The Times she later married a Tasmanian Aboriginal person, William Lanne (known as "King Billy") who died in March 1869. By 1873, Truganini was the sole survivor of the Oyster Cove group, and was again moved to Hobart.

Death

She died in May 1876 and was buried at the former Female Factory at Cascades, a suburb of Hobart. Before her death, Truganini had pleaded to colonial authorities for a respectful burial, and requested that her ashes be scattered in the D'Entrecasteaux Channel. She feared that her body would be mutilated for perverse scientific purposes as William Lanne's had been.

Despite her wishes, within two years, her skeleton was exhumed by the Royal Society of Tasmania. It was placed on public display in the Tasmanian Museum in 1904 where it remained until 1947. Only in April 1976, approaching the centenary of her death, were Truganini's remains finally cremated and scattered according to her wishes. In 2002, some of her hair and skin were found in the collection of the Royal College of Surgeons of England and returned to Tasmania for burial.

Legacy 
Truganini is often incorrectly referred to as the last speaker of a Tasmanian language. However, The Companion to Tasmanian History details three full-blood Tasmanian Aboriginal women, Sal, Suke and Betty, who lived on Kangaroo Island in South Australia in the late 1870s and "all three outlived Truganini". There were also Tasmanian Aboriginal people living on Flinders and Lady Barron Islands. Fanny Cochrane Smith (1834–1905) outlived Truganini by 30 years and in 1889 was officially recognised as the last Tasmanian Aboriginal person, though there was speculation that she was actually mixed-race. Smith recorded songs in her native language, the only audio recordings that exist of an indigenous Tasmanian language.

According to historian Cassandra Pybus's 2020 biography, Truganini's mythical status as the "last of her people" has overshadowed the significant roles she played in Tasmanian and Victorian history during her lifetime. Pybus states that "for nearly seven decades she lived through a psychological and cultural shift more extreme than most human imaginations could conjure; she is a hugely significant figure in Australian history".

Truganini Place in the Canberra suburb of Chisholm is named in her honour.

Cultural depictions

Visual art
In 1835 and 1836, settler Benjamin Law created a pair of busts depicting Truganini and Woorrady in Hobart Town that have come under recent controversy. In 2009, members of the Tasmanian Aboriginal Centre protested an auction of these works by Sotheby's in Melbourne, arguing that the sculptures were racist, perpetuated false myths of Aboriginal extinction, and erased the experiences of Tasmania's remaining indigenous populations. Representatives called for the busts to be returned to Tasmania and given to the Aboriginal community, and were ultimately successful in stopping the auction.

Artist Edmund Joel Dicks also created a plaster bust of Truganini, which is in the collection of the National Museum of Australia.

In 1997, the Royal Albert Memorial Museum, Exeter, England, returned Truganini's necklace and bracelet to Tasmania.

Music and literature
 "Truganini's Dreaming" is the title of a song written by Bunna Lawrie, the founding member, sole songwriter and lead singer of the Australian Aboriginal band Coloured Stone. It appeared on their 1986 album, Human Love, which won the Best Indigenous Release at the ARIA Music Awards of 1987.
 Truganinni, a play about her life by Melbourne writer Bill Reid, had its premiere at the Union Theatre, University of Melbourne on 21 April 1970, directed by George Whaley and starring Jan Hamilton as Truganinni.
 "Truganini" is the name of a song by Midnight Oil, from their 1993 album Earth and Sun and Moon; this song spoke partly of Truganini herself but also of what Midnight Oil saw as Australia's environmental and social problems.
 In Mudrooroo's roman à clef Doctor Wooreddy's Prescription for Enduring the Ending of the World, one of the main characters is Trugernanna, a somewhat fictional portrayal of Truganini.
 A steamer called Truganini sailed in the South Seas in 1886, visiting Papua New Guinea.
 A racehorse named "Truganini" ran in Britain in the early 20th century and another named "Trucanini" started racing aged 2 in the 2012 season.
 The cruelty against Truganini receives explicit mention in Yuval Harari's Sapiens: A Brief History of Humankind.
 Truganani is the name of a song by Troy Kingi, from his 2019 album Holy Colony Burning Acres.

See also
 Black War
 Doctor Wooreddy's Prescription for Enduring the Ending of the World
 Tunnerminnerwait, leader and resistance fighter

Notes

Citations

Sources

Further reading

External links

 The Last of the Tasmanians on Wikisource
 Truganini (1812–1876) National Library of Australia, NLA Trove, People and Organisation record for Truganini
 Images of Truganini in State Library of Tasmania collection
 Alexander, Alison Truganini at Companion to Tasmanian History, University of Tasmania
 Russell, John (Essay) The Representation of Trucanini 1999. at fotoworkz freelance photographic
 (Article) Truganini's Funeral
 (Radio Feature) Truganini – Bushranger
 (Article) Truganini (1812?–1876) A life reflecting the tragic history of the first Tasmanians.

1812 births
1876 deaths
19th-century Australian women
History of Indigenous Australians
History of Tasmania
Indigenous Tasmanian people
Last known speakers of an Australian Aboriginal language